The 1907–08 season saw Oldham Athletic compete in the Football League Second Division after winning the Lancashire Combination in the previous season.

Statistics
		

|}

Final league table

Competitions

Second Division

F.A. Cup

References

Oldham Athletic A.F.C. seasons